The Euphrates Tunnel was a legendary tunnel purportedly built between 2180 and 2160 BCE under the river Euphrates to connect the two halves of the city of Babylon in Mesopotamia.

The existence of the Euphrates Tunnel has not been confirmed. The next underwater tunnel known to have been built is the Thames Tunnel, completed in 1841.

History
A description of the tunnel as being built and used by Queen Semiramis is given by Diodorus (fl. 50 BCE) in the Bibliotheca Historica:

Philostratus (d. 250 CE) also describes the tunnel's construction in the Life of Apollonius of Tyana:

Construction

Construction allegedly began with a temporary dam across the Euphrates, and proceeded using a "cut and cover" technique.

The tunnel allegedly spanned 12 feet high and 15 feet wide, it is presumed that it was used by pedestrians and horse driven chariots and connected a major temple with the royal palace on the other shore of the river, it was supposedly lined with brick and waterproofed with asphalt.

References

Buildings and structures completed in the 22nd century BC
Pedestrian tunnels
Tunnels completed by year unknown
Tunnels in Iraq
Babylonian art and architecture